Frederic Thesiger may refer to:

Frederick Thesiger (naval officer) (1758–1805), British and Russian naval officer 
Frederic Thesiger, 1st Baron Chelmsford, (1794–1878), Lord Chancellor of England
Frederic Thesiger, 2nd Baron Chelmsford, (1827–1905), British general
Frederic Thesiger, 1st Viscount Chelmsford, (1868–1933), Viceroy of India